T. J. Connolly (born 1971) is an Irish retired hurler and former manager of the Tipperary under-21 hurling team.

Born in Cashel, County Tipperary, Connolly first arrived on the inter-county scene as a dual player at the age of seventeen when he first linked up with the Tipperary minor teams, before later joining the under-21 sides. Connolly never played at senior level with Tipperary.

At club level Connolly was a one-time Munster medallist with Cashel King Cormac's. He also won one championship medal.

In retirement from playing, Connolly became involved in team management and coaching. He served as a selector with the Tipperary under-21 team for a number of years, before being appointed manager in 2013. He left the position of under-21 manager in 2015.

Honours

Playing honours

Cashel King Cormacs
Munster Senior Club Hurling Championship (1): 1991
Tipperary Senior Club Hurling Championship (1): 1991

Managerial ahonours

Tipperary
All-Ireland Under-21 Hurling Championship (1): 2010
Munster Under-21 Hurling Championship (1): 2010

References

1971 births
Living people
Cashel King Cormac's hurlers
Cashel King Cormac's Gaelic footballers
Tipperary inter-county hurlers
Tipperary inter-county Gaelic footballers
Hurling managers
Hurling selectors